The de Havilland Gipsy Twelve was a British aero engine developed by the de Havilland Engine Company in 1937. Approximately 95 were manufactured. It was known as the Gipsy King in Royal Air Force service.

Applications
 de Havilland DH.91 Albatross
 de Havilland DH.93 Don

Engines on display
Preserved de Havilland Gipsy Twelve engines are on public display at the following museums:

de Havilland Aircraft Museum
London Science Museum.

Specifications (Gipsy King I)

See also

References

Notes

Bibliography

 Lumsden, Alec. British Piston Engines and their Aircraft. Marlborough, Wiltshire: Airlife Publishing, 2003. .

External links

Photo of a de Havilland Gipsy Twelve at Enginehistory.org

Aircraft air-cooled V piston engines
1930s aircraft piston engines
Gipsy Twelve
Inverted V12 aircraft engines